Gujranwala Guru Nanak Khalsa College (GGNKCL) is a college of Panjab University, Chandigarh, in the city of Ludhiana. Founded in 1917, it offers undergraduate and post-graduate degree courses in various fields.

History 

The story of Gujranwala Guru Nanak Khalsa College, Ludhiana, can be delineated in three distinct phases.  The first phase and the foundation of the college fall within the orbit of Sikh Renaissance of the early 20th century.  Some people drawn from amongst the Sikh elite of Gujranwala endowed with a strong philanthropic impulse got together in 1889 AD and formed a Khalsa Committee (later Khalsa Educational Council) to establish a Khalsa High School in Gujranwala Town.  This school started functioning four years ahead of the famous Khalsa Collegiate School, Amritsar.  The foundation stone of the huge palatial building of this school was laid on 18 November 1912 by Sir Luious Dane, Governor of the Punjab on the outskirts of habitation of Gujranwala.  Before long, the school became the most popular, in the entire region beyond the river Ravi up to Peshawar.  We find a mention of the Khalsa Educational Council, Gujranwala in high eulogistic terms in the Punjab University Calendar, Lahore (1918), when the council applied for affiliation to start an intermediate College. Mr M U Moore, an Irishman, was appointed as the first principal of this college.  He stayed for about two years and levelled the ground for sprouting healthy traditions for the college.  By the year 1920, the college building was completed.  In 1921 AD, Bhai Jodh Singh (later vice-chancellor, Punjabi University, Patiala) joined as a principal.  He was instrumental in starting the Medical and Non-Medical streams.  

However, this period also witnessed some tragic events – the Jalianwala Bagh massacre at Amritsar and riots in Gujranwala in reaction thereto, imposition of martial law and bombardment of Khalsa School Boarding House and the playgrounds.  During this very period, Mahatma Gandhi and Lajpat Rai visited Gujranwala in June 1921 (because Section 144 had been clamped at Lahore and they could not arrange any public meeting there), addressed a responsive public gathering there and gave a call to the people to join the non-cooperation programme of the Congress.  Both addressed the students of Guru Nanak Khalsa College as well.  In such circumstances, the management was hard pressed to get the college disaffiliated from the Punjab University, Lahore, and allow therein the launch of Basic Education programme based on vocational/skill training, as advocated by Mahatma Gandhi.  But this programme met with success nowhere in the entire country. Still some students and teachers in our college (then named as Guru Nanak Khalsa National College) tried hard to pursue this ‘national’ programme.  Prof. Sher Singh (Chemistry) was named as a principal and subjects like commerce and industrial chemistry were introduced.  But all this led the enthusiasts nowhere.  However, after the return of normalcy, the college management lost no time to get the college re-affiliated to the Punjab University, Lahore. 

Bawa Harkrishan Singh joined as a principal sometime around 1926. He started his career as a lecturer in English at Khalsa College, Amritsar.  

Gujranwala Guru Nanak Khalsa College after Partition in 1947:
The migratory caravans of the Sikhs stepped out of the college camp; bidding goodbye to their ancestral homes, the idea of resurrection of the college at a suitable place on the Indian side of Punjab caught the minds of Sikh leaders who had been associated with the Guru Nanak Khalsa College at Gujranwala as the nerve-centre of Sikh activities.  S. Jeet Singh Chawla, Honorary Secretary (1941–61), Khalsa Educational Council, Gujranwala hurriedly managed to collect the land documents as also the FDRs from the bank lockers.  As soon as they could arrange shelters for their families in various towns of present Punjab/Delhi after reaching India, they started search for collaborators/suitable site to rehabilitate the college.  It was an uphill task; indeed.  Still sometime around May 1953, S. Jeet Singh Chawla and his close associates; the Giani trio, Lal Singh, Raghbir Singh and Harjit Singh, made up their mind to establish the college at Ludhiana.  Happily, the Malwa Khalsa Diwan people suggested to them that they could hire the building then in the process of being vacated by the Govt. College for Women in the Civil Lines (they had been provided by the Punjab Government with a newly constructed vast campus).

A claim was filed for the property left at Gujranwala, which was admitted for Rs.35,91,000, but only the sum of Rs.2,44,000 was received as a rehabilitation grant to start afresh.  That is why the institution had to raise the building at Ludhiana, brick by brick.  Each unit of the buildings, incongruous as it might appear, has a story to tell.  A huge bungalow with ten rooms and two big grassy lawns (no longer visible) was purchased to house offices/classrooms in the first instance.  A makeshift hostel was constructed in one corner of this mansion.  The neighbouring small pieces of land around it were added in fragments.  Now they all have acquired distinct identities as Science Block, Commerce Block, Administrative Block, the Guru Nanak Auditorium, Principal (Sant) Teja Singh Library.  The college Gurdwara is appropriately centrally placed. There are smart class rooms and big halls in a three-storey building for ever-expanding Computer Science laboratories to cater to especially the BCA and the PGDCA programmes and for the students enrolled in conventional courses.

Courses 
The institute offers courses in various streams. The graduate and Post graduate programs offered are
 Bachelor of Science (Non-Medical) (B.Sc.)
 Bachelor in Computer Application (BCA)
 Bachelor in Commerce  (B.Com)
 Bachelor of Arts  (B.A.)
 Master of Science (Chemistry) M.Sc. (Chem.)
 Master of Arts (English) M.A. (ENG)
 Master of Arts (Punjabi) M.A. (Pbi)
 Master of Commerce (M.Com)
 Post Graduate Diploma in Computer Application (PGDCA)
B.Voc. Courses
B.Voc. (Web Technology and Multimedia)
B.Voc. (E-Commerce and Digital Marketing)
B.Voc. (Banking and Financial Services)
B.Voc. (Retail Management)
Community College Courses
Hardware and Network Maintenance Technology
Accounting and Taxation
Travel and Tourism Management
Diploma of Pharmacy (D.Pharmacy)

Add on courses 
 Communicative English
 Journalism
 Bank Management
 Certificate Course in Mobile Repair
 Certificate Course in Hardware Repair
 Certificate Course in Information and Communication Technology

Societies and clubs 
The college consists of numerous societies. These include:
 Bhai Mardana Ji Kirtan Sewa Society
 Bhai Kanhaiya Ji Sewa Society
 Sarbat Da Bhalaie
 Music Club
 Youth Adventure Club
 Bhangra/Gidha Club
 Rotaract Club
 Bhagat Puran Singh Eco Club
 Hindi Sahitya Club

References

External links
 www.ggnkcl.com// Gujranwala Guru Nanak Khalsa College
 Panjab University
 Ludhiana Colleges 

Universities and colleges in Punjab, India
Education in Ludhiana